No Stylist (stylized in all caps) is the fifth mixtape by American rapper Destroy Lonely, released through Opium, Interscope Records and Ingrooves on August 12, 2022. In the United States, the mixtape entered at number 91 on the Billboard 200. The deluxe version titled NS+ (Ultra) was released on November 18, 2022.

Critical reception
TiVo Staff from AllMusic gave the mixtape 1.5 out of 5 stars and criticized that "The resulting project isn’t devoid of quality, but it is devoid of feeling. A sharper pen game and some personal tales might give the project some much-needed personality, but for now, it does little to differentiate Lone." He also picked "TURNINUP" ("A camera-flash masterwork of bouncing synths") and the airy "CRYSTLCSTLES" the best tracks of the mixtape.

Track listing

Notes

 All tracks are stylized in all caps and shown as one word. For example, “No Stylist” is stylized as “NOSTYLIST”.
 The A’s on tracks 3, 12, 13, and 15 are removed. For example, “Crystal Castles” is stylized as “CRYSTLCSTLES”.
 "Jet Lagged" is stylized as "JETLGGD".
 “Vetements Coat” is stylized as “VTMNTSCOAT”.
 “Fake Niggas” is stylized as “FAKENGGAS”.
 “Lonely” is stylized as “LNLY”.
 “Pressure” is stylized as “PRSSURE”.

Charts

References

2022 albums

Albums produced by TM88